Gökcan Kaya (born 7 August 1995) is a Danish professional footballer who plays as a midfielder for Turkish club Pendikspor.

Club career

Denmark
In May 2012 at the age of 16, Kaya signed a youth-contract with Randers FC.

He got his debut for the first team in a cup-match against Kolding BK who Randers won 7–1, where he started on the bench, but replaced Mads Fenger in the 62nd minute.

On 10 June 2015, it was announced, that Kaya had signed a contract with Hobro IK. Kaya got his debut for Hobro on 19 July 2015, in a 3-0 defeat against OB.

Turkey
On 29 August 2016, it was confirmed, that Kaya moved to Turkish club Manisaspor. On the last day of the transfer window in January 2017, Kaya was sold after five months in Manisaspor to Tuzlaspor.

On 15 July 2021, Kaya joined Eyüpspor. On 19 January 2022, Kaya was loaned out to TFF Second League club Pendikspor for the rest of the season. He got his official debut two days later against Zonguldak Kömürspor.

References

External links
 
 
 

1995 births
People from Randers
Danish people of Turkish descent
Living people
Danish men's footballers
Association football midfielders
Denmark youth international footballers
Randers FC players
Hobro IK players
Manisaspor footballers
Tuzlaspor players
Eyüpspor footballers
Pendikspor footballers
Danish Superliga players
TFF First League players
TFF Second League players
Danish expatriate men's footballers
Expatriate footballers in Turkey
Danish expatriate sportspeople in Turkey